The 2021 Israeli legislative election was held using closed list proportional representation. Each party presented a list of candidates to the Central Elections Committee prior to the election.

Blue and White
The Blue and White list is headed by Benny Gantz.

Benny Gantz
Pnina Tamano-Shata
Hili Tropper
Michael Biton
Orit Farkash-Hacohen
Alon Schuster
Eitan Ginzburg
Yael Ron Ben-Moshe
Mufid Mari
Ruth Wasserman Lande
Alon Tal
Yehudit Uliel Malka
Elham Khazen
Shai Zoldan
Shai David
Hizki Haim Yehezkel Sibak
Monica Yael Lev-Cohen
Arbel Yager Yellin
Keren Gonen
Or Shalev
Sharona Amar
Amir Shoshani
Amir Eliezer
Raz Friedman
Kobi Figaro
Tamar Shavit
Daniel Shmuel Avigdor
Yosef Mazor
Michal Moskowitz
Noa Mantber
Boaz Hanani
Michal Sara Dor
Dan Ben Yehuda
Assaf Namani
Yossi Cohen
Yonatan Yosef Damari
Anat Shadmi
Yosef-Yossi Toubor
Aviv Moses
Meirav Ziv Silverberg
Nofar Abuharon
Michael Yisraelov
Itamar Yehuda
Zvi Avissar
Batya Oren
Avri Steiner
Idan Lazar
Gavriel Oren
Pinhas Cohen
Uzi Yonah
Shimon Sasi
Ilan Shabtai Factor
David Assayag
Pierre Barnes
Hillel Hillman

Joint List
The Joint List list is headed by Ayman Odeh.

Ayman Odeh (Hadash)
Ahmad Tibi (Ta'al)
Sami Abu Shehadeh (Balad)
Aida Touma-Suleiman (Hadash)
Osama Saadi (Ta'al)
Ofer Cassif (Hadash)
Heba Yazbak (Balad)
Yousef Jabareen (Hadash)
Juma Azbarga (Balad)
Sondos Saleh (Ta'al)
Jabar Asakla (Hadash)
Youssef Atauna (Hadash)
Aiad Rabi (Balad)
Jassan Abdallah (Taal)
Noa Levi (Hadash)
Mahasan Kis (Balad)
Feeda Abu-Dbai-Nara (Hadash)
Haitam Zakhalakeh (Taal)
Marweh Abed (Balad)
Shawiri Shadi Zidan (Hadash)
Samir Ben Said (Taal)
Safouat Abu Ria (Hadash)
Orly Noi (Balad)
Said Issa (Taal)
Darwish Raabi (Hadash)
Raid Gataas (Balad)
Mouanes Abed Al Halim(Taal)
Efraim Davidi (Hadash)
Nahala Tanus (Balad)
Ahmed Dalasheh (Taal)
Omar Wakad (Hadash)
Walid Kaaden (Balad)
Kassem Sallem (Hadash)
Zohir Yousefiyeh (Taal)
Monir Hamoudeh (Hadash)
Saliman Al Athaika (Balad)
Abid Abidd (Taal)
Mor Shoshan Stoller (Hadash)
Salim Huri (Hadash)
Silaan Dalal (Balad)
Wafi Abu Ahmed (Taal)
Bosina Dabit (Hadash)
Muhamad Agbariyeh (Balad)
Oren David Peled (Hadash)
Shadi Basal Abaas (Taal)
Arin Harika (Hadash)
Lulu Taha (Balad)
Ffatima Abu Ardat (Taal)
Itai Aknin (Hadash)
Kassem Bakri (Balad)
Omar Saksak (Hadash)
Maaher Husseim (Taal)
Tamar Mareh (Hadash)
Halled Abu Sakut (Balad)
Hussin Htib (Hadash)
Ziad Awida (Taal)
Mustafa Washahi (Hadash)
Attia Darawsha (Balad)
Masaab Duhan (Hadash)
Muhamad Bakri (Hadash)
Albaier Andria (Balad)
Noha Bader (Hadash)
Mouanes Shalabi (Hadash)
Isa Nikkola (Hadash)
Muhamad Sobah (Balad)
Eitan Klinsky (Hadash)
Ziad Muhara (Taal)
Balal Hamarshi (Hadash)
Jasser Tagrir Jabarin (Balad)
Samah Iraqi (Hadash)
Nasser Mansour (Taal)
Huria Nasra (Hadash)
Mahmoud Souwed (Balad)
Assaad Knanneh (Hadash)
Roni Felsen (Taal)
Moria Shlomot (Hadash)
Halled Titi (Balad)
Zohir Karkabi (Hadash)
Assad Hasan (Taal)
Nabila Espanioli (Hadash)
Hassan Alnsasreh (Balad)
Najiba Gataas (Hadash)
Liana Huri (Hadash)
Samy Yassin (Hadash)
Az Aladin Badraan (Balad)
Hanna Zand-Zelshich (Hadash)
Izhar Zabidaath (Taal)
Amir Badraan Sliman (Hadash)
Salah Diraouwi (Taal)
Binyamin Gonen (Hadash)
Fathi Dakkeh (Balad)
Touwafik Knaani (Hadash)
Munir Abbed Al Halim (Taal)
Abbed Alrahim Forkeh (Balad)
Naif Hajazi (Taal)
Fouz Abidd (Hadash)
Leah Zemmel Warshawsky (Balad)
Salin Sali Ismail (Taal)
Ali Saruji (Taal)
Arafat Badarneh (Hadash)
Abdullah Abu Ma'aruf (Hadash)
Tatour Doua Hosh (Balad)
Ramez Jaraisi (Hadash)
Mai Gabar (Taal)
Tamar Gozansky (Hadash)
Riad Mahamid (Balad)
Asaad Mahul (Hadash)
Muhamad Wathed (Taal)
Haneen Zoabi (Balad)
Mansoour Dahamsha (Hadash)
Adal Aamar (Hadash)
Nasir Faour (Taal)
Wasil Taha (Balad)
Naif Sakran (Taal)
Dov Khenin (Hadash)
Mtanes Shehadeh (Balad)
Afu Agbaria (Hadash)
Aly Hidar (Taal)
Jamal Zahalka (Balad)
Mohamed Nafa (Hadash)

Labor
The Israeli Labor Party list is headed by Merav Michaeli.

Merav Michaeli
Omer Bar-Lev
Emilie Moatti
Gilad Kariv
Efrat Rayten
Ram Shefa
Ibtisam Mara'ana 
Nachman Shai
Naama Lazimi
Gil Beilin
Eran Hermoni
Nissim Lasry
Alice Goldman
Maya Nuri
Amir Hanifas
Vladimir Sverdlov
Yael Aran
Yael Fisher
Nofar Drukman
Haim Har-Zahav
Orit Taya Yagarado
Gavri Bar Gil
Bracha Klimstein Levi 
Yitzhak Taim
Sari Yerushalmi-Ram
Abie Avraham Binyamin
Orit Tovim
Farahan Abu Riash
Oded Fried
Kinneret Ifrah
Moshe Ben Attar
Hadas Shaharvani Seidon
Efraim Eliezer Bolmash
Naava Katz
Mulham Malham Daar
Noga Ratz
Shlomi Weiser
Idit Frianti
Shalom Daksal
Nurit Shem Tov
Mark Sarvia
Nira Stufiya Schwartz
Nir Yitzhak Breitman
Dan Bikler
Yaron Gadot Zerchensk
Yuval Shapira
Theodore Neuwirth
Yonatan Naji Tzadik
Daniel Azoulai
Itamar Ilan Wagner
Fabian Svir
Gal Reich
Nir Rosen
Yehonatan Regev
Tal Yehezkel Alovich
Yaacov Mizrahi
Noa Golani
Or Ziv
Ofer Kornfel
Ofer Rimon
Simon Elfassi
Masha Lubelsky
Ophir Pines-Paz
Amram Mitzna
Edna Solodar
Uzi Baram
Avraham Shochat
Shimon Shitrit
Ra'anan Cohen
Moshe Shahal
Aharon Yadlin

Likud 
The party is headed by Benjamin Netanyahu. A Likud committee confirmed on 30 December 2020 that no primaries will be held, and the list submitted on behalf of the party will be the same as the list submitted in the previous elections, except for six candidates chosen by Netanyahu who will be elected in the fifth, 26th, 28th, 36th, 39th, and 40th slots. The 28th slot was given to a candidate from the Atid Ehad party.

Benjamin Netanyahu
Yuli Edelstein
Israel Katz
Miri Regev
Yariv Levin
Yoav Galant
Nir Barkat
Gila Gamliel
Avi Dichter
Haim Katz
Eli Cohen
Galit Distel-Atbaryan
Tzachi Hanegbi
Ofir Akunis
Yuval Steinitz
Dudi Amsalem
Gadi Yevarkan
Amir Ohana
Ofir Katz
Eti Atiya
Yoav Kisch
David Bitan
Keren Barak
Shlomo Karhi
Miki Zohar
Orly Levy-Abekasis
Keti Shitrit
Ofir Sofer
Fateen Mulla
May Golan
Tali Ploskov
Uzi Dayan
Ariel Kallner
Osnat Mark
Amit Halevi
Yair Gabbai
Nissim Vaturi
Shevah Stern
Nael Zoabi
Boris Aplichuk
Ayoob Kara
Matti Yogev
Yehudah Glick
Nurit Koren
Ze'ev Fleishman
Avital Dichter
Anat Berko
Nir Hirschman
Yaron Mazuz
Avraham Neguise
Nava Boker

Meretz
The Meretz list is headed by Nitzan Horowitz.

Nitzan Horowitz
Tamar Zandberg
Yair Golan
Ghaida Rinawie Zoabi
Issawi Frej
Mossi Raz
Michal Rozin
Gaby Lasky
Ali Salalha
Kati Piasecki

New Economic Party
The New Economic Party list is headed by Yaron Zelekha.

Yaron Zelekha
Osnat Akirav
Alean El-Krenawi
Itzik Turgeman 
Nadav Asael 
Tzipi Meinmeiner
Wahl Krim
Einat Kaufman
Itamar Glazer
Yehuda Messing

New Hope
The New Hope list is headed by Gideon Sa'ar.

Gideon Sa'ar
Yifat Shasha-Biton
Ze'ev Elkin
Yoaz Hendel
Sharren Haskel
Benny Begin
Meir Yitzhak Halevi
Zvi Hauser
Michal Shir
Hila Shay Vazan
Dani Dayan
Michel Buskila
Ofer Berkovitch
Avi Ganon
Michal Diamant
Sahar Pinto
Sahar Ismail
Alon Keysar
Orna Davidai
Dovrat Weizer

Religious Zionists
The Religious Zionists list is headed by Bezalel Smotrich.

Bezalel Smotrich (National Union–Tkuma)
Michal Waldiger (National Union–Tkuma)
Itamar Ben-Gvir (Jewish National Front)
Simcha Rothman (National Union–Tkuma)
Orit Strook (National Union–Tkuma)
Avi Maoz (Noam)
Racheli Zinkin (National Union–Tkuma)
Ayanau Fareda Sanbatu (National Union–Tkuma)
Eliyahu Attiya (National Union–Tkuma)
Yitzhak Wasserlauf (Jewish National Front)

Shas
The Shas list is headed by Aryeh Deri.

Aryeh Deri
Ya'akov Margi
Yoav Ben-Tzur
Michael Malchieli
Haim Biton
Moshe Arbel
Yinon Azulai
Moshe Abutbul
Uriel Buso
Yosef Taieb
Avraham Betzalel
Netanel Haik

United Arab List
The United Arab List list is headed by Mansour Abbas.

Mansour Abbas
Mazen Ghnaim
Walid Taha
Said al-Harumi
Iman Khatib-Yasin

United Torah Judaism
The United Torah Judaism list is headed by Moshe Gafni.

Moshe Gafni
Yaakov Litzman
Uri Maklev
Meir Porush
Ya'akov Asher
Yisrael Eichler
Yitzhak Pindros
Ya'akov Tessler
Eliyahu Baruchi
Moshe Shimon Roth
David Ohana
Benjamin Hershler
Isaac Reich
Joseph Bahm

Yamina
The Yamina list is headed by Naftali Bennett.

Naftali Bennett
Ayelet Shaked
Alon Davidi
Matan Kahana
Amichai Chikli
Nir Orbach
Abir Kara
Idit Silman
Shirly Pinto
Shai Maimon
Yomtob Kalfon
Stella Weinstein
Roni Sassover
Orna Starkmann
Asher Cohen
Jeremy Saltan

Yesh Atid
The Yesh Atid list is headed by Yair Lapid.

Yair Lapid
Orna Barbivai
Meir Cohen
Karine Elharrar
Meirav Cohen
Yoel Razvozov
Elazar Stern
Mickey Levy
Meirav Ben-Ari
Ram Ben Barak
Yoav Segalovich
Boaz Toporovsky
Idan Roll
Yorai Lahav-Hertzano
Vladimir Beliak
Ron Katz
Nira Shpak
Tania Mazarsky
Yasmin Fridman
Inbar Bezek
Moshe Tur-Paz
Simon Davidson
Ronit Erenfroind
Zohar Bloom
Yifat Ben Shoshan
Ibrahim Kasem
Oz Haim
Tommer Vinner
Michal Slawny Cababia
Yaron Levi

Yisrael Beiteinu
The Yisrael Beiteinu list is headed by Avigdor Lieberman.

Avigdor Lieberman
Oded Forer
Evgeny Sova
Eli Avidar
Yulia Malinovsky
Hamad Amar
Alex Kushnir
Yossi Shain
Limor Magen Telem
Elina Bardach-Yalov

References

2021
Party lists